The Torran Rocks are a group of small islands and skerries located between the islands of Mull and Colonsay in Scotland.

Geography and geology 
The main rocks are Dearg Sgeir, MacPhail's Anvil, Na Torrain,  Torran Sgoilte and Torr an t-Saothaid although there are numerous others including the southernmost of Sgeir Dhoirbh (or Otter Rock). The southern group of rocks and Ruadh Sgeir are formed from potassium-feldspar-phyric monzogranite intruded as part of the Caledonian Igneous Supersuite towards the end of the Caledonian orogeny (late Silurian to early Devonian period) and form an outlying part of the Ross of Mull pluton. Dearg Sgeir and Torr an t-Saothaid are monzogranite to granodiorite and hybridised with diorite enclaves. Na Torrain and McPhail's Anvil are formed from equigranular biotite monzogranite.

Navigation hazard
Between 1800 and 1854 thirty ships were wrecked on the Torrans with the loss of over fifty lives. An astonishing 24 vessels were lost in the area in a storm on 30–31 December 1865. The writer Hamish Haswell-Smith describes the rocks as "being scattered over a wide area like dragon's teeth. They lurk menacingly just beneath the surface, occasionally showing themselves in a froth of white spittle". Nicholson (1995) calls them " of jumbled granite teeth" and that "the extent and confused nature of this reef claimed untold numbers of vessels plying between America or the Baltic ports and Oban". The reefs are so hazardous that only small boats can hope to navigate them with any degree of safety.

In literature
In addition to being a hazard to navigation, they  are one of the locations featured in the novel Kidnapped by Robert Louis Stevenson. It was in this "stoneyard" that Alan Breck Stewart and David Balfour were ship-wrecked. David Balfour, the hero of this tale was then marooned on neighbouring Erraid for a while. Stevenson's father, Thomas was the designer of  Dubh Artach lighthouse, and the young Robert Louis knew the area well. He wrote of a "black brotherhood - the Torran reef that lies behind, between which and the shore the Iona Steamers" (taking visitors to Iona and Staffa) "have to pick their way on their return to Oban.

This passage begs comparison with Kidnapped itself:
Altogether it was no such ill night to keep the seas in; and I had begun
to wonder what it was that sat so heavily upon the captain, when the
brig rising suddenly on the top of a high swell, he pointed and cried to
us to look. Away on the lee bow, a thing like a fountain rose out of the
moonlit sea, and immediately after we heard a low sound of roaring.

"What do ye call that?" asked the captain, gloomily.

"The sea breaking on a reef," said Alan. "And now ye ken where it is;
and what better would ye have?"

"Ay," said Hoseason, "if it was the only one."

And sure enough, just as he spoke there came a second fountain farther
to the south.

"There!" said Hoseason. "Ye see for yourself. If I had kent of these
reefs, if I had had a chart, or if Shuan had been spared, it's not sixty
guineas, no, nor six hundred, would have made me risk my brig in sic a
stoneyard! But you, sir, that was to pilot us, have ye never a word?"

"I'm thinking," said Alan, "these'll be what they call the Torran
Rocks."

"Are there many of them?" says the captain.

"Truly, sir, I am nae pilot," said Alan; "but it sticks in my mind there

Mr. Riach and the captain looked at each other.

"There's a way through them, I suppose?" said the captain.

"Doubtless," said Alan, "but where? But it somehow runs in my mind once
more that it is clearer under the land."

Etymology
Haswell-Smith (2004) states that the name is derived from the Gaelic for "loud murmering or thunder" although in a different context Mac an Tàilleir describes Torrain as meaning "hillocks".

References
Notes

Bibliography

 Bathhurst, Bella (2000) The Lighthouse Stevensons. London. Flamingo.
 
 Murray, W.H. (1966) The Hebrides. London. Heinemann.
 Nicholson, Christopher. (1995) Rock Lighthouses of Britain: The End of an Era? Caithness. Whittles.?
Stevenson, Robert Louis (1887) Memories and Portraits. Chatto and Windus. Reprinted by 1st World Publishing, 2004.
 Stevenson, Robert Louis (1995) The New Lighthouse on the Dhu Heartach Rock, Argyllshire. California. Silverado Museum. Based on an 1872 manuscript and edited by Swearingen, R.G.

Islands of the Inner Hebrides
Skerries of Scotland
Uninhabited islands of Argyll and Bute
Archipelagoes of Scotland